Rehearsals for War is a 1998 Italian drama film directed by Mario Martone. It was screened in the Un Certain Regard section at the 1998 Cannes Film Festival.

Cast
 Andrea Renzi - Leo
 Iaia Forte - Luisella Cielo
 Maurizio Bizzi - Maurizio
 Salvatore Cantalupo - Rosario
 Antonello Cossia - Antonello
 Francesca Cutolo - Francesca
 Giovanna Giuliani - Giovanna
 Vincenzo Saggese - Vincenzo
 Lucia Vitrone - Lucia
 Roberto De Francesco - Diego
 Marco Baliani - Vittorio
 Nina Di Majo - Giornalista
 Beniamino Femiano - Varriale
 Tatà Donnabella - Capo redattore
 Toni Servillo - Franco Turco
 Anna Bonaiuto - Sara Cataldi

References

External links

1998 films
Italian drama films
1990s Italian-language films
1998 drama films
Films directed by Mario Martone
1990s Italian films